Roger Lallemand (17 January 1932 – 20 October 2016) was a Walloon lawyer, socialist politician, and president of the Belgian Senate.

Education
He graduated as a licentiate in Romance philology and obtained a doctorate in law at the Universite Libre de Bruxelles (ULB).

Career
Lallemand started his career in 1958 as a lawyer at the bar in Brussels. In 1971–1972 he chaired the Conference of Young Barristers in Brussels. From 1979 until 1985 he served as a co-opted senator and from 1985 until 1999 as a directly-elected senator, both for the Parti Socialiste (PS). He was President of the Belgian Senate from 10 March 1988 until 10 May 1988. He also served as a member of the Ixelles municipal council from 1983 until 2006.

His bill to legalize abortion under certain conditions, he co-submitted with Lucienne Herman-Michielsens, was approved by the Belgian parliament on 3 April 1990. This law modified Article 348.,350.,351 and 352 of the Belgian penal code (title VII, chapter I) and raised Article 353. As from 1999 he is honorary President of the senate and in 2002, he was appointed as a Minister of State.

Honours 
 2002 : Minister of State, By Royal Decree of HM King Albert II.
 1999 : Grand Cordon in the Order of Leopld.
 1991 : Commander in the Legion of Honour.

References

Sources 
Roger Lallemand, La Belgique, pays d’incertitude, Brussels, 1998.
Roger Lallemand

1932 births
2016 deaths
Belgian Ministers of State
Belgian socialists
Belgian women's rights activists
Free University of Brussels (1834–1969) alumni
Presidents of the Senate (Belgium)
Walloon people
Male feminists